Disney Magic Kingdoms is a 2016 city building game developed and published by Gameloft for iOS, Android, and Windows. It is themed off the Walt Disney Parks & Resorts. The game was officially launched on March 17, 2016.

Storyline
The game takes place in the Kingdom, a place primarily based on Disneyland and Magic Kingdom. Mickey Mouse is the protector of the Kingdom. When Maleficent casts an evil spell on the Kingdom, ridding it of all its powerful magic, the players have to help it get back, creating their own park. Occasionally, Merlin appears as a guide to advance the story.

Gameplay
Progressing through the storyline the player unlocks more characters and attractions. Players can earn Magic and Experience by sending characters on quests and tasks, and sometimes Tokens to unlock or level up characters. Premium characters and attractions are unlocked using Gems, which are earned by leveling up characters, completing character collections, or viewing daily announcements.

The game also features chests, occasionally hidden in the Kingdom, but also can be bought for Gems, which award different prizes depending on the type of chest, such as attractions, Tokens, decorations, or concessions. Also in the game is Merlin's Shop, in which the player can obtain Tokens and attractions through Elixirs, which are obtained by exchanging them for decorations and concessions in Merlin's cauldron. The game also includes floats based on each franchise, which grant Magic, Tokens or Gems through parades.

Playing during Major Events players can unlock limited-time characters and attractions. Once the Events are over, this content occasionally returns in limited-time chests, and less frequently in other types of Events.

Some characters also have costumes, which can be obtained through Tokens, Gems, or as a prize at an Event.

For the most part, the characters in the game are involved in storylines that serve as a continuation of the events in their respective films.

Starting in Update 60 (July, 2022), the game introduced the Season Pass, with which for a period of 90 days, players can earn prizes by earning Happiness Points for the Kingdom by completing some quests, which include tasks that are daily, weekly, and during the Events. The Season Pass is divided between the Free Prizes, which include prizes for all players, and the Kingdom Pass, which is purchased through a real money purchase, with which players can get extra prizes.

Cast and characters
The following Mickey and Friends and Toy Story characters, plus Merlin from The Sword in the Stone (1963), had voice recordings from their official and/or original voice actors at the time of the game's initial release. No additional voice recordings were ever made for the game.
Tim Allen as Buzz Lightyear
Tony Anselmo as Donald Duck
Jeff Bennett as Merlin
Jim Cummings as Pete and the opening cutscene narrator
Joan Cusack as Jessie
R. Lee Ermey as Sarge
Bill Farmer as Goofy and Pluto
Jim Hanks as Woody
Bret Iwan as Mickey Mouse
Tress MacNeille as Daisy Duck
Annie Potts as Bo Peep
John Ratzenberger as Hamm
Wallace Shawn as Rex
James Patrick Stuart as Zurg
Russi Taylor as Minnie Mouse

Character collections in the game

Kingdom Story
The character collections in the permanent storyline of the game with unlockable characters during the progress of the game include:

The Sword in the Stone
Mickey and Friends
DuckTales
Toy Story
Cinderella
Star Wars
Peter Pan

Pirates of the Caribbean
Monsters, Inc.
WALL-E
Tangled
Sleeping Beauty
Zootopia
Bambi

The Jungle Book
Lady and the Tramp
Dumbo
Pocahontas
The Emperor's New Groove
Ratatouille
The Rescuers

Events
The character collections in the game with unlockable characters during Events or limited-time offers include:

The Incredibles
Nightmare Before Christmas
Frozen
Mulan
Beauty and the Beast
The Lion King
Aladdin
Alice in Wonderland
Snow White and the Seven Dwarfs

Winnie the Pooh
Lilo & Stitch
Big Hero 6
The Little Mermaid
Wreck-It Ralph
The Princess and the Frog
Moana
Finding Nemo
Coco

Haunted Mansion
Star Wars
Onward
Hercules
Brave
Raya and the Last Dragon
Luca
101 Dalmatians
Pinocchio

Robin Hood
Up
Turning Red
Hocus Pocus
The Hunchback of Notre Dame
Soul
Encanto

Reception
Neilie Johnson for Common Sense Media gave the game a three out of five star rating and commented, "Unlike the carefully crafted theme park experiences that are designed to thrill guests and make them forget those long hours in line, this mobile Magic Kingdom is too focused on in-game purchases. The first 10 minutes are fun for kids, with players joining forces with Mickey, Goofy, and Merlin to get rid of Maleficent's evil magic. Players are taught how to assign tasks to characters and collect magic and items (used to upgrade characters); however, after 10 minutes, wait times increase, and upgrading characters only results in a brief animation. Also, being able to visit other parks is confusing: It's unclear why you're visiting, and it feels a bit like stealing to take earned potion. Perhaps worst of all is that players are told they can build attractions where and when they want to, but long build timers and a poor placement system make it difficult to set things up in an attractive -- or even sensible -- way. The upside? This is a mobile game whose lack of kid-friendliness could be addressed with enough player feedback. It's chock-full of favorite Disney characters, an engaging narrative, familiar Magic Kingdom attractions, and real Disney music. It could be great with less focus on meaningless missions and money and more on creativity and fun. As it stands, it may appeal to older players who are already used to this mechanic and who have practice in patience or their own money to burn."

Notes

References

External links
Disney Magic Kingdoms at Gameloft
Official website

2016 video games
Disney video games
Gameloft games
IOS games
Android (operating system) games
Metafictional video games
City-building games
Video games developed in the United States
Video games about parallel universes
Video games set in amusement parks
Video games containing battle passes
Single-player video games
Video games based on Walt Disney Parks and Resorts attractions
Mickey Mouse video games
Donald Duck video games
Windows games